Georg Jahn (5 May 1869, Meißen - 18 November 1940, Loschwitz) was a German painter and graphic artist; known primarily for his etchings.

Life and work 
He grew up in a family that was closely associated with the Meißen Porcelain Manufactory. His grandfather, Christian Gottlieb Jahn, was a Supervisor there at the turn of the 19th century. His father, Karl August Moritz Jahn, was a "bossier" (someone who assembles single porcelain items from separate parts), while his older brothers, Ernst and Robert, were porcelain painters.  

At the age of fourteen, he followed them into that profession, During his years at the manufactory (1883-1888), his talents were recognized and he was awarded a scholarship to attend the Dresden Academy of Fine Arts. There, he studied with the portrait painter, Leon Pohle. He left the Academy in 1890; completing his studies at the Grand-Ducal Saxon Art School, Weimar, with Professor Max Thedy, a noted portrait and interior painter. For several years, he worked as an itinerant illustrator and portraitist in Berlin, Leipzig, and Munich. In 1897, he settled in Loschwitz, a suburb of Dresden.

In the meantime, he had developed an interest in etching, and took lessons from his friend, Max Pietschmann. He created his first large work, "Female Nude", shortly after arriving in Loschwitz. In 1899, he received an award for his etchings at the Deutsche Kunstausstellung in Dresden. That same year, he married Johanne Goltzsche. Although he initially etched a variety of subjects, he soon focused on human figures. 

He was awarded the 1914 "Saxon State Medal". In 1929, on the occasion of his 60th birthday, the Kunstverein held a major showing of his works. In the late 1930s, his etchings were represented in Munich at the Große Deutsche Kunstausstellung; a display of works approved by the Nazi regime.

He died at his home in Loschwitz, and was interred in Meißen at the  Saint Wolfgang Cemetery. His gravesite is modest, but has been preserved. A major retrospective of his works was given by the Kunstverein in 2006. Many of his etchings may be seen at the Kupferstichkabinett and the Städtische Galerie in Dresden.

Selected works

Sources 
 Hans-Georg Jahn: Der Dresdner Radierer Georg Jahn, self-published, Wiesenbach/Heidelberg 1999
 Paul Rausch: "Deutsche Kunst der Gegenwart: Georg Jahn, Meister der Graphik", In: Dresdner Neueste Nachrichten, 10./11. September 1938
 Franz Schubert: "Der Dresdner Radierer Georg Jahn", In: Dresdner Neuste Nachrichten. 8/9. February 1941
 "Jahn, Georg", In: Allgemeines Lexikon der Bildenden Künstler von der Antike bis zur Gegenwart, Vol. 18: Hubatsch–Ingouf, E. A. Seemann, Leipzig 1925
 "Georg Jahn". In: Hans Vollmer (Ed.): Allgemeines Lexikon der bildenden Künstler des XX. Jahrhunderts, Vol.2: E–J. E. A. Seemann, Leipzig 1955, pg.524

External links 

 
 Georg Jahn website, by Hans-Georg Jahn
 More works by Jahn @ ArtNet

1869 births
1940 deaths
German artists
German etchers
Dresden Academy of Fine Arts
People from Meissen